Voice Access is a Accessibility mobile app developed by Google. Voice access let you control your phone using your Voice. For using Voice access you just need to say to Google Assistant "Hey Google, Voice Access".

History 
Google's Voice Access app was in Beta from last 2 years before releasing.

Later it was launched in 2018.

Features 
The features is designed to help make the phone more accessible for anyone with disability, but can also be used when your hands are full.

See also 
 List of Android apps by Google

References 

Google software
Android (operating system) software